The 1948 Massachusetts gubernatorial election was held on November 2, 1948. Democrat Paul A. Dever defeated Republican incumbent Robert F. Bradford, Socialist Labor candidate Horace Hillis, and Prohibition candidate Mark R. Shaw.

Republican primary

Candidates
Robert F. Bradford, incumbent Governor
Edward Rowe, State Senator

Results

Democratic primary

Candidates

Declared
 Paul Dever, former Attorney General and candidate for Lieutenant Governor in 1946

Withdrew
 Maurice Tobin, former Governor (withdrew to become United States Secretary of Labor)

Results

General election

Results

See also
 1948 Massachusetts general election
 1947–1948 Massachusetts legislature

References

Governor
1948
Massachusetts governor
Massachusetts gubernatorial election